Fight Cancer was a 6-part health series challenging the negative attitudes that surround cancer.
It was transmitted on BBC1 in 1989 and was presented by newscaster Martyn Lewis and actress Lynne Perrie, a cancer survivor. Perrie and Lewis travelled around Britain talking to other survivors.

The first episode was broadcast on BBC One on 12 October 1989, and in it, celebrities Russ Conway, Barbara Kelly and Diane Moran described their battles with cancer and their hopes for the future.

References

External links

1989 British television series debuts
1989 British television series endings
BBC Television shows
British documentary television series
English-language television shows
Television series about cancer